Christophe Faudot (born 27 September 1968) is a French former racing cyclist. He rode in the 2000 Tour de France, but dropped out on the 8th stage.

Major results
1990
 3rd Overall Tour du Loir-et-Cher
 3rd Paris–Troyes
1996
 7th Classic Haribo
1997
 2nd Tour du Finistère
1999
 8th Tour du Doubs
2000
 7th Tour du Doubs

References

1968 births
Living people
French male cyclists
People from Luxeuil-les-Bains
Sportspeople from Haute-Saône
Cyclists from Bourgogne-Franche-Comté